The Woodbridge Township School District is a comprehensive community public school district that serves students in kindergarten through twelfth grade from Woodbridge Township in Middlesex County, New Jersey, United States. All schools are accredited by the Middle States Association of Colleges and Schools.

As of the 2018–19 school year, the district, comprising 26 schools, had an enrollment of 13,888 students and 1,122.7 classroom teachers (on an FTE basis), for a student–teacher ratio of 12.4:1. The high schools offer more than 150 courses, including Advanced Placement, college preparatory, business, vocational and cooperative work/study programs.

The district is classified by the New Jersey Department of Education as being in District Factor Group "DE", the fifth-highest of eight groupings. District Factor Groups organize districts statewide to allow comparison by common socioeconomic characteristics of the local districts. From lowest socioeconomic status to highest, the categories are A, B, CD, DE, FG, GH, I and J.

Awards and recognition
During the 2008-09 school year, Kennedy Park School #24 was recognized with the Blue Ribbon School Award of Excellence by the United States Department of Education, the highest award an American school can receive. Lynn Crest School was recognized as a "Blue Ribbon" School during the 2009-10 school year.

For the 2005-06 school year, the district was recognized with the "Best Practices Award" by the New Jersey Department of Education for its "Blooming Buddies-The Garden Club" Science program at Matthew Jago Elementary School.

For the 2004-05 school year, Matthew Jago Elementary School was named a "Star School" by the New Jersey Department of Education, the highest honor that a New Jersey school can achieve.

Schools
Schools in the district (with 2018–19 enrollment data from the National Center for Education Statistics) are:
Elementary schools
Mawbey Street School #1 (365; K-5 - built 1962)
Avenel Street School #4&5 (398; K-5 - built 1912)
Port Reading School #9 (392; K-5 - built 1962)
Ross Street School #11 (383; K-5 - built 1920)
Ford Avenue School #14 (247; K-5 - built 1924)
Indiana Avenue School #18 (514; K-5 - built 1955)
Menlo Park Terrace #19 (349; K-5 - built 1958)
Claremont Avenue School #20 (305; K-5 - built 1958)
Oak Ridge Heights School #21 (289; K-5 - built 1959)
Lynn Crest School #22 (336; K-5 - built 1959)
Woodbine Avenue School #23 (506; K-5 - built 1960)
Kennedy Park School #24 (317; PreK-5  - built 1960)
Lafayette Estates School #25 (483; K-5 - built 1960)
Robert Mascenik School #26 (312; K-5 - built 1960)
Pennsylvania Avenue School #27 (339; K-5 - built 1964)
Matthew Jago School #28 (406; K-5  - built 1969)
Oak Tree Road School #29 (524; K-5 - opened 2018)
Middle schools 
Avenel Middle School (590; 6-8)
Colonia Middle School (619; 6-8)
Fords Middle School (653; 6-8)
Iselin Middle School (748; 6-8)
Woodbridge Middle School (516; 6-8)
High schools
Colonia High School (1,325; 9-12)
John F. Kennedy Memorial High School (1,324; 9-12)
Reaching Individual Student Excellence (RISE) (30; 9-12)
Woodbridge High School (1,473; 9-12)

Administration
Core members of the district's administration are: 
Dr. Joseph Massimino, Superintendent
Brian Wolferman, Business Administrator / Board Secretary

Board of education
The district's board of education, with nine members, sets policy and oversees the fiscal and educational operation of the district through its administration. As a Type II school district, the board's trustees are elected directly by voters to serve three-year terms of office on a staggered basis, with three seats up for election each year held (since 2012) as part of the November general election.

Controversy
Lois Rotella, former Assistant Superintendent of Curriculum and Instruction, left her position in early August 2012. After her departure, "the district has been notoriously tight-lipped about matters since various schools have been under investigation by the State Board of Education's Office of Fiscal Accountability and Compliance... because of a high number of wrong-to-right erasures on the New Jersey Assessment of Skills and Knowledge (NJASK) standardized tests."

In 2015, it was found out that Ford Avenue School #14 principal Cathie Bedosky was encouraging students to cheat on the NJASK standardized test. She also poorly trained test proctors, and hired unqualified people to administer the test. She was later suspended by vote at the Woodbridge Board of Education.

References

External links

Woodbridge Township Public Schools

School Data for the Woodbridge Township Public Schools, National Center for Education Statistics

Woodbridge Township, New Jersey
New Jersey District Factor Group DE
School districts in Middlesex County, New Jersey